Lakis Nikolaou (born 17 July 1949) is a Greek former professional footballer who played as a center back. He is the current medical director of AEK Athens.

Early life
Nikolaou was born on July 18 of 1949 in Ios of Cyclades. He spent his school years in Peristeri and finished high school in 1966 at the Anargyrio and Korgialenio School, in Spetses where he was enrolled as a boarder together with his brother. He started playing football at an early age, when with friends and neighbors they formed the Irodotos Peristeri team, playing friendly matches with other teams in the area. In these matches he was watched by the people of Atromitos, who signed in 1967. In Atromitos he started playing as a defender and then as a striker, due to the team's lack of attackers. Finishing high school, he succeeded in entering the Mathematics Department but his burning desire to study medicine made him drop out of school and enroll in the Medical School of Bari, with the purpose of transferring to the University of Athens, which he did. During his stay in Bari, he played with the amateur team Barletta as a sweeper.

Club career
In 1971, after 4 years of presence in the offensive line of Atromitos, he aroused the interest of the big clubs. In one of Atromitos' matches, the then coach of AEK Athens, Branko Stanković and the administrator of the club Stamatis Papastamatiou, who watched the match, were impressed by the playing style of Nikolaou. So AEK acquired Niklaou with a promise of 300 thousand drachmas as a signature premium, which was never given to him. For 3 years he competed as a striker, while at the same time he continued his studies at the Medical School. This juxtaposition proved particularly difficult as required attendance at faculty workshops and mandated attendance at team practiced often come at the expense of one another. This double occupation brought Nikolaou very close from being released from AEK in 1974, but under the possibility of signing to any of their big rivals, the president of AEK, Barlos called him to stay in the club. Nikolaou accepted with the term that the 1971 signature premium of 300 thousand drachmas to be given to him and rejoined the team but the pay remained to be seen until today. Under František Fadrhonc he was moved to the center of the defense, giving AEK a leader in defense for the next decade. The team of Barlos and Fadrhonc, where Nikolaou was a starter, excelled in Greece and abroad as they progressed to the UEFA Cup semi-final in 1977. winning 2 Championships and 1 Greek Cup including a double in 1978. The defensive partnership he created alongside Petros Ravousis, complementing each other were considered one of the best definsive duos in the history of the league. He was declared "Athlete of the year" for the years 1974 and 1979 by the Panhellenic Sports Press Association. After the departure of Mimis Papaioannou, Nikolaou became the team's captain for many years. In the summer of 1980, Nikolaou decided to stop his football career remaining in the club only as the team's doctor. As AEK faced problems midseason, Nikolaou was urgently called by the then coach, Miltos Papapostolou to put on his football shoes again and help the team. He accepted and competed for another one and a half season in the yellow-black jersey. His final match was on May 30, 1982 against Kastoria.

International career
Nikolaou played with Greece U19 15 times, where he competed in the European Championship in 1971.

Nikolaou made his debut for Greece on 8 September 1973 and played a total of 15 games. He was a participant at the UEFA Euro 1980.

Other activities
In his medicine career, Nikolaou received the title of the specialty of orthopedics and was declared a doctor of the University of Athens in 1975. He obtained the specialty title of Orthopedics in February 1981 and in 1985 he received the title of Doctor of the University of Athens. From 1983 to 1986 Nikolaou did further training at Duke in the USA in the field of sports injuries and has been awarded by the American Orthopedic Association for his pioneering work in cruciate ligament transplants of the knee and his long-term studies in the field of the physiology of muscle injuries. At AEK, he was a team doctor for a number of years, while since 1987 he has been the head of their medical department. Since 1987, his professional relationship with the Orthopedic Clinic of the Medical Center led a medical coverage agreement between the Center and Olympiacos, which brought him as head of the medical department of the club from 2003 to 2009. He was the doctor of the national teams of Greece from 1982 to 1994, while he served as President of its Health Committee and consequently a member of the Board of Directors in 1994-95.

On 8 October 1997, after pressure and with AEK Athens having financial issues, he accepted the assumption of the presidency of club under the owner company ENIC for a period of about a year.

Personal life
He has been married to his beloved Eleni since 1974 and has 3 children and 5 grandchildren.

Honours

AEK Athens
Alpha Ethniki: 1977–78, 1978–79
Greek Cup: 1977–78

References

External links

1949 births
Living people
Greek footballers
Greece international footballers
Association football central defenders
AEK Athens F.C. players
AEK Athens F.C. chairmen
Levadiakos F.C. players
UEFA Euro 1980 players
Super League Greece players
AEK F.C. non-playing staff
People from Ios